Weißensee Academy of Art Berlin, also known as Berlin-Weissensee Art Academy, School of Art and Design Berlin-Weissensee is a non-profit, public art school in Berlin-Weißensee, Berlin, Germany, founded in 1946. The student enrollment is around 850 students in 2021.

References

External links
 Official website

Weißensee Academy of Art Berlin
Arts in Berlin
Universities and colleges in Berlin